Kostroma Governorate (Kostromskaya guberniya) was an administrative division (a guberniya) of the Russian Empire and the Russian SFSR, which existed from 1796 to 1929. Its administrative center was in the city of Kostroma.

Administrative division
Kostroma Governorate consisted of 12 uyezds (their administrative centres in brackets):
 Buysky Uyezd (Buy)
 Varnavinsky Uyezd (Varnavino)
 Vetluzhsky Uyezd (Vetluga)
 Galichsky Uyezd (Galich)
 Kineshemsky Uyezd (Kineshma)
 Kologrivsky Uyezd (Kologriv)
 Kostromskoy Uyezd (Kostroma)
 Makaryevsky Uyezd (Makaryev)
 Nerekhtsky Uyezd (Nerekhta)
 Soligalichsky Uyezd (Soligalich)
 Chukhlomskoy Uyezd (Chukhloma)
 Yuryevetsky Uyezd (Yuryevets)

History

References
 

 
Governorates of the Russian Empire
Governorates of the Russian Soviet Federative Socialist Republic
States and territories established in 1796
States and territories disestablished in 1929
1796 establishments in the Russian Empire